Fayolle may refer to:
 Bertrand Fayolle (born 1975), French former footballer and manager
Émile Fayolle (1852–1928), a Marshal of France
 Guy de Fayolle (1882–1944), a French philatelist
 Jean Fayolle (born 1937), a French former long-distance runner
Fayolle, François-Joseph-Marie (1774-1852), French critic of music

See also 
 Château de Fayolle (Tocane-Saint-Apre), a castle in Dordogne, Aquitane, France